Sasha Stone may refer to:

 Sasha Stone (blogger) (born 1965), American blogger, founder of Awards Daily blog
 Sasha Stone (photographer) (born 1940), Russian photographer

See also
 Sacha Stone , British New Age influencer and conspiracy theory promoter